Bartłomiej Wojciech Bonk (born 11 October 1984) is a Polish weightlifter. He won the silver medal at the 2012 Summer Olympics in the men's 105 kg category with a total of 410 kg. He also competed at the 2008 Summer Olympics, but failed to score.

References

Polish male weightlifters
Olympic weightlifters of Poland
Weightlifters at the 2008 Summer Olympics
Weightlifters at the 2012 Summer Olympics
Weightlifters at the 2016 Summer Olympics
Olympic silver medalists for Poland
1984 births
World Weightlifting Championships medalists
Living people
Olympic medalists in weightlifting
People from Więcbork
Medalists at the 2012 Summer Olympics
Sportspeople from Kuyavian-Pomeranian Voivodeship
European Weightlifting Championships medalists
20th-century Polish people
21st-century Polish people